Scunthorpe (Dawes Lane) railway station was a small railway station, the original southern terminus of the North Lindsey Light Railway situated adjacent to the level crossing on Dawes Lane and about  mile east of the present mainline station, opened in 1926, and about  mile east of Frodingham railway station, Scunthorpe's first station.

The station was opened on 3 September 1906 with a service to Winterton and Thealby. Passenger services ended on 13 July 1925 but the section of line through the station is still open in connection with bulk waste trains from sites on Greater Manchester to a landfill at Roxby mines.

References

Disused railway stations in the Borough of North Lincolnshire
Railway stations in Great Britain opened in 1906
Railway stations in Great Britain closed in 1925
Former Great Central Railway stations